The Thirlmere Aqueduct is a 95.9-mile-long (154.3-kilometre-long) pioneering section of water supply system in England, built by the Manchester Corporation Water Works between 1890 and 1925. Often incorrectly thought of as one of the longest tunnels in the world, the aqueduct's tunnel section is not continuous.

The construction of the reservoir and aqueduct was authorised by the Manchester Waterworks Act of Parliament. The first phase was completed in 1897 and, for the pipeline sections, subsequent phases were completed in 1925. The first water to arrive in Manchester from the Lake District was marked with an official ceremony on 13 October 1894.

The route of the reservoir passes through Lancashire and then enters Manchester through Salford. It has been mapped on OpenStreetMap here: https://www.openstreetmap.org/relation/7937446

History

His first recommendation was to source water from Ullswater, but it was eventually decided to seek powers to acquire Thirlmere and build a dam there. In the face of local opposition the project received Royal Assent in 1879.

Tunnel under Dunmail Raise Pass
This tunnelled section under Dunmail Raise was dug by two teams mining towards each other. The two tunnel sections joined within 20 cm of centre.

Thirlmere Dam

Aqueduct technical data

The aqueduct is 95.9 miles long from Thirlmere reservoir to Heaton Park Reservoir , Prestwich. Typically, the conduit has  of cover and traverses the contours of hillsides.

It is the longest gravity-fed aqueduct in the country, with no pumps along its route. The level of the aqueduct drops by approximately 20 inches per mile (30 cm/km) of its length.

Construction history
Sections of the route of the aqueduct have over time been modified for the construction of modern motorways.  During the construction of the M6 and M61 connection a short section was diverted.  A short section of the aqueduct near Worsley, Greater Manchester, was also re-routed in the late 1960s during the construction of the M62/M63/M602 motorway interchange.

References

Further reading
Hoyle, N.  & Sankey, K. Thirlmere Water, a Hundred Miles, a Hundred Years Centwrite, Bury  1994   .

External links

Salford council website showing listed status and an image (Dead link)
North West Public health Observatory: Cryptosporidium in the North West water supply
 Mansergh, James. "The Thirlmere water scheme of the Manchester Corporation : with a few remarks on the Longdendale Works, and water-supply generally."  London: Spon, 1879 - popularising lecture, with copious plans & elevations, including map showing aqueduct route

Aqueducts in England
Grade II listed buildings in Greater Manchester
Buildings and structures in Cumbria
Works by John Frederick Bateman
Grade II listed bridges in Greater Manchester